Andreas Faber-Kaiser (5 April 1944 – 14 March 1994) was a Spanish writer. He was editor of the UFO and occult magazine Mundo Desconocido.

Jesus Died in Kashmir

Faber-Kaiser authored Jesus Died in Kashmir in 1977. He was a proponent of the gnostic view that Jesus survived his crucifixion, was hidden by Essenes and travelled to India. Fabier-Kaiser cited discredited apocrypha forgeries such as William Dennes Mahan's A Correct Transcript of Pilate's Court.

Publications 
 ¿Sacerdotes o cosmonautas? (1971)
 Cosmos-Cronología general de la Astronáutica (1972)
 Grandes enigmas del Cielo y de la Tierra (1973)
Hacia la Conquista del Universo (1974)
 Jesús Vivió y murió en Cachemira (1976) (translated as Jesus Died in Kashmir, 1977)
 OVNIs: el archivo de la CIA - Documentación y memorandos (1980)
 OVNIs: el archivo de la CIA - Informes de avistamientos (1980)
 OVNIs: archivos americanos - Documentos militares y de inteligencia (1980)
 La caverna de los tesoros (1984)
 Las nubes del engaño [Crónica extrahumana antigua] (1984)
 Fuera de control [Crónica extrahumana moderna] (1984)
 Sobre el secreto [La isla mágica de Pohnpei y el secreto de Nan Matol] (1985)
 Pacto de silencio (1988)
 El muñeco humano (1989)

References

1944 births
1994 deaths
Pseudohistorians
Spanish male writers
Swoon hypothesis